Colm Rigney (born 25 April 1978) is an Irish rugby union player and coach.

References

1978 births
Connacht Rugby players
Irish rugby union coaches
Irish rugby union players
Leeds Tykes players
Living people